Fito & Fitipaldis is a Spanish rock band, formed in 1998. It was created by Fito Cabrales with the intention of publishing songs which were not in the style of his other band, Platero y Tú. Its style is a mix of rock, soul, swing, and other genres. By October 2014 the band's sales had surpassed 1,600,000 discs.

Former and Current members
Singer & guitar: Adolfo "Fito" Cabrales
Guitar: J.A. Batiz, Carlos Raya, Txus Alday
Bass: Edu Baxter, Roberto "Candy" Caramelo, Miguel Colino
Drums: Arturo García, Ricardo Cantera, Fernan Irazoki, José "el niño" Bruno, "Polako", Daniel Griffin, Coki Giménez
Saxophone: Javi Alzola
Piano: Mario Larrañaga
Hammond organ and Keyboards: Joserra Semperena

Timeline

Discography

Studio albums

Live albums

In other media
The song "Por la boca vive el pez" is a DLC song in the video game Guitar Hero World Tour

See also
Platero y Tú
Extrechinato y Tú
Extremoduro
Rosendo Mercado

Notes

External links
Official site
Fitipaldis.com
DRO
Last Tour International

Spanish musical groups
Spanish rock music groups
Rock en Español music groups
Musical groups established in 1998
Warner Music Latina artists